Irving Owen Hunt (January 30, 1878 – June 17, 1951) was an American college football and professional football player and coach. He served as the head football coach at the University of South Carolina at Columbia, South Carolina from 1899 to 1900, compiling a record of 5–7.

Ice hockey career
While a student at Brown University, in his home city of Providence, Rhode Island, Hunt took part in the first intercollegiate ice hockey games the university played in when Brown's ice hockey team appeared against Harvard at Franklin Field in Boston on January 19, 1898. Hunt, a forward, scored three goals in four intercollegiate games for Brown University during the 1897–98 season and also played for the team during the 1898–99 campaign.

Late life and death
Hunt graduated from Harvard Law School and practiced law in Providence, Rhode Island for 12 years, until 1917, when he moved to Wyoming, Pennsylvania, where he farmed.  He died on June 17, 1951, at Nesbitt Hospital in Kingston, Pennsylvania after suffering a fall four hours earlier at his home in Wyoming.

Head coaching record

References

External links
 

1878 births
1951 deaths
19th-century players of American football
Brown Bears football players
Brown Bears men's ice hockey players
Homestead Library & Athletic Club players
South Carolina Gamecocks athletic directors
South Carolina Gamecocks football coaches
Harvard Law School alumni
Lawyers from Providence, Rhode Island
People from Luzerne County, Pennsylvania
Sportspeople from Providence, Rhode Island
Players of American football from Providence, Rhode Island
Ice hockey people from Providence, Rhode Island
Farmers from Pennsylvania
Accidental deaths from falls
Accidental deaths in Pennsylvania